Oupeye is a municipality of Wallonia located in the province of liège, Belgium. 

On January 1, 2006, Oupeye had a total population of 23,581. The total area is 36.11 km² which gives a population density of 653 inhabitants per km².

The municipality consists of the following districts: Haccourt, Hermalle-sous-Argenteau, Hermée, Heure-le-Romain, Houtain-Saint-Siméon, Oupeye, and Vivegnis.

Chertal

Chertal is a narrow isthmus approximately 1.5 km southeast of Oupeye bounded by the Albert Canal and Meuse. Since 1963 the land has been the site of a steel factory founded by Espérance-Longdoz (as of 2010 part of ArcelorMittal Liège).

See also
 List of protected heritage sites in Oupeye

References

External links
 

Municipalities of Liège Province